Pareiorhina pelicicei is a species of cascudinho (catfish) endemic to Brazil where it is known from Córrego Tamborete, in Rio Grande basin in the State of Minas Gerais of southeastern Brazil. The specific name is an honor to ichthyologist Fernando Mayer Pelicice.

References

Loricariidae
Fish of South America
Fish of Brazil
Endemic fauna of Brazil
Fish described in 2015